The women's shot put event at the 2014 African Championships in Athletics was held on August 14 on Stade de Marrakech.

Results

References

2014 African Championships in Athletics
Shot put at the African Championships in Athletics
2014 in women's athletics